Igor Žuržinov (born 30 May 1981) is a retired Serbian football defender.

References

1981 births
Living people
People from Pančevo
Serbian footballers
FK Dinamo Pančevo players
FK Slavija Sarajevo players
HŠK Zrinjski Mostar players
NK Istra 1961 players
FK Borac Banja Luka players
Croatian Football League players
Association football defenders
Serbian expatriate footballers
Expatriate footballers in Bosnia and Herzegovina
Serbian expatriate sportspeople in Bosnia and Herzegovina
Expatriate footballers in Croatia
Serbian expatriate sportspeople in Croatia